Erythrina zeyheri, commonly known as the ploughbreaker, is a deciduous, geoxylic subshrub and member of the Fabaceae, which is endemic to southern Africa. It grows no more than 60 cm tall and occurs naturally in the higher altitude grasslands of South Africa's central plateau, and that of adjacent Lesotho. They favour deep clay soil in the vicinity of creeks and marshes, and often form colonies. Its specific name commemorates the 19th century botanist, Karl Zeyher.

Description
It is a geoxylic plant, sometimes called an "underground tree", that produces annual stems, some 50 to 60 cm long. It has glabrous, leathery, trifoliolate leaves with large leaflets. The rachis and main leaf venation, which are prominently raised below, are armed with recurved spines on both leaf surfaces. The petioles and stems are likewise armed to discourage browsers. The shoots and leaves are deciduous, dying away during harsh highveld winters, when the plant survives as an extensive woody, tuberous rootstock.

The upright inflorescences appear in summer, with the leaves, from October to January. The drooping scarlet, or rarely white flowers, are capped by a red calyxes. Their fruit are smooth black pods when mature, each containing a few large (1.0 to 1.7 cm long) seeds. These are hard and orange-red in colour.

Foodplant
It is a foodplant for the moth Terastia margaritis.

Gallery

References

External links
Colony of Erythrina zeyheri after a grass-fire, Operation wildflower

Geoxyles
zeyheri
Flora of South Africa